= 1977 Liechtenstein operations centre referendum =

- 2 October 1977
- Referendum on building a safe operation centre

Results
Choice	Votes	%
Yes	1,867	54.42%
No	1,564	45.58%
Valid votes	3,431	96.48%
Invalid or blank votes	125	3.52%
Total votes	3,556	100.00%
Registered voters/turnout	4,833	73.58%

A referendum on building a safe operation centre was held in Liechtenstein on 2 October 1977. The proposal was approved by 54.4% of voters.

== Results ==
Choice	Votes	%
For	1,867	54.4
Against	1,564	45.6
Invalid/blank votes	125	–
Total	3,556	100
Registered voters/turnout	4,833	73.6
Source: Nohlen & Stöver
